Wainwright Air Station  is a military airport located in Wainwright, Alaska. It is owned by the United States Air Force.

Facilities and aircraft 
Wainwright Air Station has one runway designated 3/21 with a gravel surface measuring 3,000 by 100 feet (914 x 30 m). For the 12-month period ending July 12, 1977, the airport had 110 aircraft operations, an average of 9 per month: 45.5% air taxi, 45.5% general aviation, and 9% military.

See also 
 Wainwright Airport (Alaska)
 List of airports in Alaska

References

External links 
 Topographic map from USGS The National Map
 

Installations of the United States Air Force in Alaska
Airports in North Slope Borough, Alaska